Superbagnères is a ski resort above the town of Bagnères-de-Luchon in the French department of Haute-Garonne in the Midi-Pyrénées region.

Overview
The resort offers alpine ski slopes and cross-country skiing from 1440 to 2260 m. The resort was opened early in the twentieth century. Historically it was connected to the town by a rack railway, but today it is connected with a gondola lift. Each cabin holds up to four people and takes about ten minutes to reach the summit, running in the summer as well as the winter. It's not possible to ski back down to Luchon, except in times of exceptional snow for talented locals who know the woods.

Details of climb
From Bagnères-de-Luchon the climb to the ski-station is 18.5 km at an average gradient of 6.3%, with the summit being at 1800 m above sea-level. There are several short stretches in excess of 10%.

Tour de France

The Tour de France has had stage finishes at Superbagnères six times:

External links

Ski station website
Skiing holidays in Luchon - Superbagneres
Luchon-Superbagnères dans le Tour de France 
Profile of climb on www.climbbybike.com
Superbagnères on Google Maps (Tour de France classic climbs)

Tourist attractions in Haute-Garonne
Ski areas and resorts in France
Haute-Garonne communes articles needing translation from French Wikipedia